Mairead Berry (born 1975) is a former Irish Paralympic swimmer who competed in international level events.

In 2001, Berry officially launched and named a 50,000-ton ship, MV Ulysses at a special ceremony Dublin Port.

References

1975 births
Living people
Sportspeople from Dublin (city)
Paralympic swimmers of Ireland
Swimmers at the 1992 Summer Paralympics
Swimmers at the 1996 Summer Paralympics
Swimmers at the 2000 Summer Paralympics
Medalists at the 1992 Summer Paralympics
Medalists at the 1996 Summer Paralympics
Medalists at the 2000 Summer Paralympics
Paralympic medalists in swimming
Paralympic gold medalists for Ireland
Paralympic silver medalists for Ireland
Irish female freestyle swimmers
S2-classified Paralympic swimmers